Casabianca is a  nuclear attack submarine of the French Navy. Laid down in 1981, she was launched in 1984 and commissioned in 1987. She is scheduled as likely to be withdrawn from service in 2023.

Between 1993 and June 1994, the boat undertook a major refitting which upgraded the boat to the level of Améthyste, arming the latter for anti-submarine as well as anti-surface ship warfare. The boat's underwater endurance is 60 days, dictated by food supplies. The boat is designed to operate at seas 220 days per year, and is thus staffed by two crews that replace each other from one patrol or exercise to the next.

Among Casabiancas operational highlights are revolved around being the first French submarine to visit the naval base at Severomorsk, home of the Russian Northern Fleet, in 2003; and patrols in the Mediterranean and in the Indian Ocean as part of the fleet surrounding the aircraft carrier , such as in 2007.

During the Péan inter-allied maneuvers of 1998, Casabianca managed to "sink"  and her  escort cruiser  during a simulated attack.

See also 

Luc-Julien-Joseph Casabianca
List of submarines of France

Notes and references

External links 

Rubis-class submarines
Ships built in France
Cold War submarines of France
Submarines of France
1984 ships